Federal Capital Territory Senatorial District in Federal Capital Territory, Nigeria covers 6 local governments which include: Abuja, Abaji, Kwali, Bwari, Gwagwalada and Kuje. FCT senate district has within its territory Nigera’s seat of power (Aso Rock Presidential Villa, the National Assembly and Judicial headquarters). Philip Aduda is the current representative of FCT Senatorial District.

List of senators representing FCT

References 

Federal Capital Territory (Nigeria)
Senatorial districts in Nigeria